Gracilignathichthys is an extinct genus of prehistoric ray-finned fish that lived during the early Ladinian stage of the Middle Triassic epoch in what is now Europe.

See also

 Prehistoric fish
 List of prehistoric bony fish

References

Middle Triassic fish
Pholidopleuriformes